Wright Township is the name of 2 townships in the U.S. state of Michigan:

 Wright Township, Hillsdale County, Michigan
 Wright Township, Ottawa County, Michigan

See also
 Wright Township (disambiguation)

Michigan township disambiguation pages